Monica Cavanagh RSJ is an Australian religious sister. She is the congregational leader of the Sisters of St Joseph of the Sacred Heart (Josephites) and was formally president of Catholic Religious Australia, the peak body for Catholic religious orders in Australia.

See also
Mary Mackillop
Catholic Church in Australia

References

External links
"Sister Monica Cavanagh Elected CRA President" media release

21st-century Australian Roman Catholic nuns
Sisters of St Joseph of the Sacred Heart
Year of birth missing (living people)
Living people